Kathryn Johnston Memorial Park is a park in the English Avenue neighborhood of Atlanta, Georgia, United States.

History 
The park is one in a series of parks to be built in the area to mitigate flooding, with the park capable of managing up to 3.5 million gallons of rainwater per year. The park had its groundbreaking in summer 2018. Located along Joseph E. Boone Boulevard, the park was initially to be called Boone West Park, but shortly before its groundbreaking was renamed to honor Kathryn Johnston, who had lived nearby and was killed in a police shooting in 2006. The park was officially opened on November 21, 2019, on the 13th anniversary of Johnston's death. That same year, Atlanta City Council voted to install a plaque honoring former councilmember Ivory Lee Young in the park.

References

Bibliography

Further reading 
 

Parks in Atlanta
English Avenue and Vine City